The Pasimoni River is a river in the state of Amazonas, Venezuela. It is a tributary of the Casiquiare canal, in turn a tributary of the Rio Negro.

The Pasimoni forms on the northern slope of the Cerro de la Neblina and flows northward to Casiquiare canal.
It surrounded by low, poorly drained country.
It drains a heavily forested region where the driest months are December to February, but rain is common in the dry season.
It is a classic blackwater river with low pH, conductivity, solute and nutrients.

See also
List of rivers of Venezuela

References

Sources

Rivers of Venezuela